UI, Ui, or ui may refer to:

Arts and entertainment
 Ui (band), an American post-rock band
 Ui Miyazaki (born 1981), Japanese voice actress
 Ui Shigure, Japanese illustrator
 Arturo Ui, a fictional character from The Resistible Rise of Arturo Ui by Bertolt Brecht
 Youichi Ui (born 1972), Japanese motorcycle road racer
 Manami Ui (born 1986), Japanese model

Businesses and organizations

Universities
 University of Ibadan, Nigeria
 University of Iceland
 University of Idaho, US
 University of Illinois, US
 University of Iloilo, Philippines
 University of Indonesia, Indonesia
 University of Innsbruck, Austria
 University of Iowa, US
 Universities Ireland, Northern Ireland
 University of Isfahan, Iran

Other businesses and organizations
 The United Illuminating Company, a regional electric distribution company in the northeastern US
 Eurocypria Airlines (IATA airline designator UI)
 Unix International, an open-standard association

Science, technology, and mathematics

Computing
 Unit interval (data transmission), also pulse time or signal duration time
 User interface, between human and machine

Other uses in science, technology, and mathematics
 International unit, typically used for medication dose
 Unit injector for diesel engines
 Urinary incontinence

Other uses
 Ui (digraph), used in some writing systems
 UI, unauthorised information; see Glossary of contract bridge terms#unauth
 Unemployment insurance
 United Ireland, a proposed state
 Universitas Indonesia railway station, a commuter rail station in Indonesia located in University of Indonesia

See also 
U1 (disambiguation)
μi, The initial magnetic permeability of a material

Japanese feminine given names
Japanese-language surnames